Princess Augusta of Württemberg (4 October 1826 in Stuttgart – 3 December 1898, ibid.) was a daughter of King William I of Württemberg and his wife, Pauline of Württemberg.

Life 
Augusta was the third and last child of her parents' marriage.  She was described as unattractive, but cheerful and wise.  On 17 June 1851, she married Prince Hermann of Saxe-Weimar and Eisenach.  He was her age and served in the Cavalry of Württemberg as an officer. Later that year, he was promoted from Rittmeister to lieutenant colonel.  In 1853, he was promoted to commander of the guards regiment.

Weimar Palace at Neckarstraße 25 was, for many years, the center of an artistically oriented social life. In 1865, Hermann left the army with the rank of lieutenant general, because he was denied further promotions. He had tried to become King Charles's adjutant general and imperial governor of Alsace-Lorraine but was unsuccessful. For lack of other activities, Prince Weimar, as he was called in Stuttgart, supported social, patriotic and artistic societies.

Issue 
Hermann and Augusta had six children:
 Princess Pauline of Saxe-Weimar-Eisenach (1852-1904)
 married in 1873 to Hereditary Grand Duke Charles Augustus of Saxe-Weimar-Eisenach (1844-1894)
 Prince Wilhelm of Saxe-Weimar-Eisenach (1853-1924)
 married in 1885 to Princess Gerta of Isenburg-Büdingen-Wächtersbach (1863-1945)
 Prince Bernhard Saxe-Weimar-Eisenach (1855-1907), from 1901 "Count of Crayenburg", married
 in 1900 to Marie Louise Brockmüller (1866-1903)
 in 1905 to Countess Elisabeth von der Schulenburg (1869-1940)
 Prince Alexander of Saxe-Weimar-Eisenach (1857-1891)
 Prince Ernest of Saxe-Weimar-Eisenach (1859-1909)
 Princess Olga of Saxe-Weimar-Eisenach (1869-1924)
 married in 1902 to Prince Leopold of Isenburg-Büdingen (1866-1933), eldest son of Karl, Prince of Isenburg-Büdingen.

Ancestry

References 
 Sönke Lorenz, Dieter Mertens, and Volker Press (eds.): Das Haus Württemberg. Ein biographisches Lexikon, Kohlhammer Verlag, Stuttgart, 1997, 

1826 births
1898 deaths
Princesses of Württemberg
19th-century German people
Daughters of kings